"Cuerpo y Alma" is a song by Colombian-American latin pop singer-songwriter Soraya. The song was released as the lead single from her third bilingual studio album Cuerpo y Alma (2000). The song was written, produced and recorded by Soraya and Tony Nicholas. An English-language version called "I'm Yours" was released in the English/international edition of the album I'm Yours in Germany.

Track listing

References

2000 singles
2000 songs
Mercury Records singles
Songs written by Soraya (musician)
Soraya (musician) songs